Coccia is an Italian surname. Notable people with the surname include:

Carlo Coccia (1782–1873), Italian opera composer
Luigia Coccia, Italian Roman Catholic nun and missionary
Maria Rosa Coccia (1759–1833), Italian harpsichordist and composer
Vittorio Coccia (born 1918–1982), Italian footballer

Italian-language surnames